is a Japanese pop female singer-songwriter currently signed on unBORDE Records, a division of Warner Music Group Japan.

Biography 
Anri Kumaki started writing songs when she was 17 years old and won the audition of a TV program which was broadcast by Nippon Television in 2001.

Discography

Singles 
(February 21, 2002)
(August 21, 2002)
(February 21, 2003)
(April 6, 2005)
(January 25, 2006)
(May 24, 2006)
(November 22, 2006)
(February 21, 2007)
(July 25, 2007)
(May 21, 2008)
(September 24, 2008)
(December 22, 2008)
(April 8, 2009)
(June 17, 2009)
(January 18, 2012)
(March 7, 2012)

Albums 
(March 26, 2003)
(May 23, 2005)
(September 21, 2006)
(October 24, 2007)
(November 5, 2008)
(November 6, 2009)
(February 22, 2012)
(December 12, 2012)

Compilation albums 
(March 10, 2010)

Extended plays 
and...Life(October 5, 2011)

Soundtracks 
 (from the Key anime Charlotte) (November 4, 2015)

References

1982 births
People from Nagano Prefecture
Japanese women singer-songwriters
Japanese singer-songwriters
Living people
Musicians from Nagano Prefecture
21st-century Japanese singers
21st-century Japanese women singers